Okhli is a rural locality (a selo) in Levashinsky District, Republic of Dagestan, Russia. The population was 1,901 as of 2010. There are 15 streets.

Geography 
Okhli is located 23 km northwest of Levashi (the district's administrative centre) by road, on the Nakhatar River. Kulemtsa and Akhkent are the nearest rural localities.

Nationalities 
Avars live there.

References 

Rural localities in Levashinsky District